Je dis aime (1999) is the second studio album by French singer-songwriter Matthieu Chedid, in his persona as -M-, described by reviewers as a "conceptual icon to rival Bowie's Ziggy Stardust and Aladdin Sane". The album manages to take a remarkable variety of musical directions and pull them together into a consistent whole. Another reviewer describes the album as sounding like a 'French Lenny Kravitz' and notes the 'vintage 70s sound and textures'.

Wordplay
Je dis aime is a play on words in French as 'aime' (love) is pronounced exactly the same as '-M-'. Many of the tracks use similar word play as is common in French songs but particularly rich in -M-'s work.

Track listing
 Monde virtuel
 Je dis aime (written by Andrée Chedid, -M-'s famous grandmother)
 Onde sensuelle
 À celle qui dure
 Faut oublier
 Le Festival de connes (pokes fun at the pretentiousness of the Cannes film festival changing Cannes to connes – i.e. idiots)
 Le Mec hamac
 Close to Me (loosely a cover of the song by The Cure but using only one line in English from the original)
 Émilie 1000 Volts (salsa flavoured track)
 Qui est le plus fragile
 Le Complexe du corn flakes
 Au lieu du crime
 Bonoboo (written by Andrée Chedid, the song refers to a type of pygmy chimpanzee that shares over 98% of its DNA with humans)
 Le Commun des motels
 Mama Sam (Mama Sam as compared to Uncle Sam. Spot some of the punning like Nike for Nique)

References

1999 albums
French-language albums